Check-Up was a Canadian television series about medical information that aired on CBC Television in 1963.

Premise
The series was produced by the CBC in co-operation with the Canadian Medical Association. Each episode concerned a particular medical condition and featured doctors conducting a diagnosis and treatment of a patient. This was followed by interviews conducted by the host Lloyd Robertson and a guest panel of the physician, who discussed how the treatment plan was developed. The programme concluded with a follow-up of the patient

Production

Norrie Swanson of the Canadian Arthritis and Rheumatism Association served as  consultant for Check-Up. Denny Spence produced the series with Eric Koch as supervising producer.

Scheduling

The half-hour series aired Mondays at 7:30 p.m. (Eastern) from 8 July to 23 September 1963.

References

External links
 

CBC Television original programming
1963 Canadian television series debuts
1963 Canadian television series endings